Krepost (Cyrillic forms: крепость, крепост) means "fortress" in several Slavic languages, such as Russian and Bulgarian. It may refer to:

 Asenova Krepost
 Krepost Sveaborg
 Krepost, Haskovo Province
 Samuilova Krepost